Annetenna was a short-lived band that emerged from the ashes of Ednaswap. On formation, the band were immediately signed by Columbia Records and recorded a self-titled album, which was then shelved by the record label. Founding members Anne Preven and Scott Cutler continue to write and produce songs for other artists, but the Annetenna project seems to have been put to rest.

The Annetenna version of 74 Willow, a song originally recorded by the band in their Ednaswap days, was featured on the HBO series Six Feet Under. Another Annetenna song Oblivion appears on the soundtrack for The Chumscrubber.

Members
Former members
Anne Preven - vocals
Scott Cutler - guitars, keyboards
Scot Coogan - drums
Kevin Augunas - bass
Dave Levita - guitars, keyboards

Discography
Annetenna (2001), Columbia Records

External links
Official Annetenna Website
An Unofficial Ednaswap and Annetenna Website

Rock music groups from California